Salt Island can refer to:

Places

United Kingdom
Salt Island, Anglesey, Wales
Salt Island, British Virgin Islands
Salt Island, County Down, a townland in County Down, Northern Ireland

United States
Salt Island (Alaska), a small island near Atka Island in the Aleutians, United States
Salt Island (Connecticut), United States
Salt Island, an island in Isle Royale National Park, Lake Superior, United States

Other places
Saltholm, Øresund, Denmark
Salt Island, Jamaica
Sal, Cape Verde

Other uses
Isla de sal (Salt Island), a 1964 Venezuelan film directed by Clemente de la Cerda